Edward St. Loe Livermore (April 5, 1762 – September 15, 1832), son of Samuel Livermore and brother of Arthur Livermore, was a United States representative from Massachusetts.  He was born in Portsmouth in the Province of New Hampshire on April 5, 1762.  Livermore pursued classical studies, studied law, was admitted to the bar and commenced practice in Concord, New Hampshire  and later practised in Portsmouth.

Livermore served as United States district attorney 1794-1797. Livermore also served as State Solicitor for Rockingham County 1791-1793, Associate Justice of the New Hampshire Superior Court of Judicature 1797-1799, and a naval officer for the port of Portsmouth 1799-1802. He moved to Newburyport, Massachusetts in 1802 and was elected as a Federalist to the Tenth and Eleventh Congresses (March 4, 1807 – March 3, 1811).

Livermore was not a candidate for renomination in 1810. Livermore resumed the practice of law, moved to Boston in 1811, then to Zanesville, Ohio.  Livermore returned to Boston, and then moved to Tewksbury where he lived in retirement until his death there on September 15, 1832.  His interment was in the Granary Burying Ground in Boston.

He was elected a member of the American Antiquarian Society in 1815.

Livermore was the father of Samuel Livermore, the authority on civil law and of Harriet Livermore (1788–1868), a prominent Millerite preacher.

References

External links
 

1762 births
1832 deaths
Politicians from Newburyport, Massachusetts
Massachusetts lawyers
New Hampshire lawyers
United States Attorneys for the District of New Hampshire
Burials at Granary Burying Ground
Federalist Party members of the United States House of Representatives from Massachusetts
Members of the American Antiquarian Society
19th-century American politicians
18th-century American lawyers
19th-century American lawyers
18th-century American judges
Politicians from Portsmouth, New Hampshire
Justices of the New Hampshire Supreme Court